The men's marathon at the 1956 Summer Olympics in Melbourne, Australia was held on Saturday December 1, 1956. There were 46 participants from 23 nations, with 13 runners not completing the race. The maximum number of athletes per nation had been set at 3 since the 1930 Olympic Congress. The event was won by Alain Mimoun of France, the nation's first Olympic marathon victory since 1928 and third overall. Yugoslavia took its first Olympic marathon medal with Franjo Mihalić's silver. Finland returned to the podium in the event for the first time since 1932 (the end of a four-Games medal streak for the nation) as Veikko Karvonen took bronze.

Background

This was the 13th appearance of the event, which is one of 12 athletics events to have been held at every Summer Olympics. Returning runners from the 1952 marathon included defending champion Emil Zátopek of Czechoslovakia and fifth-place finisher Veikko Karvonen of Finland. Zátopek's primary challenger was Alain Mimoun of France, who had won three silver medals in the 5000 metres and 10000 metres track events in 1948 and 1952—all behind Zátopek. Mimoun was making his marathon debut. Zátopek, on the other hand, was still recovering from hernia surgery.

Burma, Ethiopia, Iran, Kenya, and New Zealand each made their first appearance in Olympic marathons; Germany appeared for the first time as the "United Team of Germany". The United States made its 13th appearance, the only nation to have competed in each Olympic marathon to that point.

Competition format and course

As all Olympic marathons, the competition was a single race. The marathon distance of 26 miles, 385 yards) was run over an out-and-back course, starting and finishing at the Olympic Stadium.

Records

These were the standing world and Olympic records prior to the 1956 Summer Olympics.

No new world or Olympic bests were set during the competition.

Schedule

All times are Australian Eastern Standard Time (UTC+10)

Results

References

External links
 Official Report
 Results

M
Marathons at the Olympics
Men's marathons
Oly
Men's events at the 1956 Summer Olympics